I Was Here may refer to:

Music
I Was Here (album), by Hubert Wu, or the title song, 2017
"I Was Here" (song), by Beyoncé, 2011
"I Was Here", a song by Lady Antebellum from the AT&T Team USA Soundtrack, 2008
"I Was Here", a song by Lisa Loeb from Feel What U Feel, 2016
"I Was Here", a song by Tina Arena from Quand tout Recommence, 2018
"I Was Here", a song from the musical The Glorious Ones, 2007

Other uses
I Was Here (film), a 2008 Estonian film
"I Was Here" (Chicago P.D.), a 2020 television episode
I Was Here, a 2015 novel by Gayle Forman